Natural history specimen dealers had an important role in the development of science in the 18th, 19th and early 20th centuries. They supplied the rapidly growing, both in size and number, museums and educational establishments and private collectors whose collections, either in entirety or parts finally entered museums.
Most sold not just zoological, botanical and geological specimens but also 
equipment and books. Many also sold archaeological and ethnographic items. They purchased 
specimens from professional and amateur collectors, sometimes collected themselves as well as acting as agents for the sale of 
collections. Many were based in mercantile centres notably Amsterdam, Hamburg, and London or 
in major cities. Some were specialists and some were taxonomic authorities who wrote scientific works and manuals, some functioned as trading museums or institutes.

This is a list of natural history dealers from the 16th to the 19th century: here are names that are frequently encountered in museum collections.

Johan Hans Abegg (fl. 1882-1885) Mineral collector and dealer in Zurich.
Augustus Theodore Abel (?1802-1882); German Mineral dealer resident in Ballarat.
Anton Franz Abraham Preparator and dealer in educational materials at " "Naturhistorisches Institut" on Beatrixgasse, Vienna, 1896, on Ungargasse, Vienna in 1903-1906.Supplied specimens to Archduke Franz Ferdinand. 
Ludwig Anker (1822, Budapest -1887) Insektenhändler
Mary Anning
Bernardino Astfäller (1879–1964) Insektenhändler in Meran
Andreas Bang-Haas 
Otto Bang-Haas
Max Bartel (1879–1914) Berlin
Leopold and Rudolf Blaschka
Julius Böhm (c. 1850?-1925) Vienna mineral dealers as "Österr.-ungar. Mineralien-Comptoir" or Austro-Hungarian Mineral Dealership.
Edward Percy Bottley Gregory, Bottley & Lloyd geology and mineral dealership
Ernst August Böttcher, born 14 June 1870 Naturalien und Lehrmittel-Anstalt Berlin C. 2, Brüderstrasse 15. 
August Friedrich Böttcher 
Brazenor Bros Dealers in zoological specimens in Brighton from 1858-1937.
Nérée Boubée Paris
Adolphe Boucard
Braun; Karl Friedrich Wilhelm (1800–1864) Fossil and mineral dealer in Regensburg :de:Karl Friedrich Wilhelm Braun 
Brendel and Sohn Botanical modelmakers in Breslau and Berlin.
Antonie Augustus Bruijn Dutch East Indies	
Jean Baptiste Lucien Buquet (Paris)
Emile Clement Australia
William Deans Cowan Madagascar
Giuseppe De Cristoforis (Milan)
Eduard Dämle Insect dealer in Hamburg.
Robert Damon Natural history dealer in Weymouth 
Jules Desbrochers des Loges French insect dealer.
Émile Deyrolle (1838–1917) French naturalist and natural history dealer in Paris. The business was originally owned by his naturalist grandfather, Jean-Baptiste Deyrolle who opened his shop in 1831 at 23, Rue de la Monnaie. Émile’s father Achille Deyrolle ran the business for many years. It is now at 46, rue du Bac, Paris
Maarten Dirk van Renesse van Duivenbode trader of bird skins in the Dutch East Indies.
Henri Donckier de Donceel Paris insect dealer
Alfred William Ecutt (1879-) Newport, Wales.
Entomologisch Institut Hamburg (E. M. Schulz) Hamburg 22, Hamburgerstrasse 45.
Josef Erber(c. 1830 – c. 1918) Mineral and natural history dealer in Vienna St. Ullrich, Siebensterngasse No. 29. 
Anton Hermann Fassl Naturhistorisches-Institut, 948 Zeidlerstrasse, Teplitz, Bohemia, Germany (now the Czech Republic) 
Adolarius Jacob Forster (1739-1806).Leading mineral dealer of the 18th century with premises in London, Paris and St. Petersburg.
R. Fuess Berlin - Steglitz mineral and petrographic specimens an instruments Heinrich Ludwig Rudolf Fuess (1838–1917):de:Rudolf Fuess.
Gustav Adolph Frank (1809–1880) Natural history dealer in Amsterdam who had worldwide trade connections.
Václav Frič (1839–1916) Prague
Hans Fruhstorfer
 
Alfred George Gabriel (1884–1968) English butterfly dealer who also worked for the British Museum. 
Karl Ludwig Giesecke Mineral dealer in Copenhagen.
Johann Cesar VI. Godeffroy The Godeffroy Museum and dealership.
Richard Haensch Berlin
Johann Wilhelm Adolf Hansemann (1784–1862) German insect dealer
Thomas Hawkins

Henry Heuland (1778-1856) London Mineral collector and dealer
Alexander Heyne Berlin
George Humphrey London dealer in shells and ‘curiosities’ in the 18th century.
Charles Jamrach
Charles Georges Javet
Edward Wesley Janson London
Jan Kalinowski Peru
E. Kieinel, München, Augustenstrasse 41 Insect dealer
 Kny-Scheerer Company, 404 West Twenty- seventh street, New York. Agency for German dealers - specimens, equipment. Active 1900- 1930s?
Friedrich Kohl (1839–1907) Fossil and mineral dealer

Adam August Krantz (1809–1872); Natural history dealer in Berlin after 1850 in Bonn.
Frank H. Lattin & Co. Albion, New York
Benjamin Leadbeater (1760–1837) Dealer in ornithological specimens.
Charles Johnson Maynard (1845-1929) Natural history dealer in Boston and Newton, Massachusetts.
Friedrich Christian Meuschen
Heinrich Benno Möschler 
Eugène Le Moult
Ida Laura Pfeiffer
Maison Azoux
Maison Tramond Established by the mid-19th century at 9 Rue de l' Ecole de Medicine in Paris. Later "Maison Tramond - N. Rouppert successeur".Models of human and comparative anatomy and osteological preparations. 
Albert Stewart Meek
Wilhelm Neuburger Berlin (between 1900 and 1910) Insect dealer
Heinrich Michael Neustetter Insect dealer, Vienna 
Friedrich Wilhelm Niepelt
Gustav Paganetti-Hummler as Zoologische Institut für Balkanforschung des Gust. Paganetti-Hummler
Ludwig Parreys (1796–1879) Parreys lived in Vienna, where he was dealer in natural history objects. Trading as Ludwig and Joseph Mann, he supplied zoological specimens to many leading taxonomists whose collections are now conserved by natural history museums.
Andrew Pritchard London
Max Quedenfeldt Berlin insect dealer.
Orazio Querci (and family). Butterfly dealer in Florence, Italy - collected extensively in Spain and Portugal also Cuba. Supplied butterflies to Roger Verity and European butterflies to R.C. Williams, Academy of Natural Sciences, Philadelphia.
Lovell Augustus Reeve

Edmund Reitter "Natural History Institute" 1879 -1880 Vienna, 1881-1891 Mödling, after 1891 Paskau and  Munich (extant).
Carl Ribbe
Heinrich Ribbe (1832–1898) Entomologist and dealer in Berlin
Hermann Rolle Berlin
William Frederick Henry Rosenberg (1868–1957) 57 Haverstock Hill, London fl. 1920s. Claimed to hold 5,000 bird species as scientific skins (and to be the largest bird skin dealership in the world). Supplier to museums and private collectors. Traveller. 
Emil Adolf Rossmässler Natural History dealer 
Karl Rost
Fritz Rühl
Auguste Sallé
L.W. Schaufuß else E. Klocke, Dresden
Christian Julius Wilhelm Schiede
Wilhelm Schlüter
Gustav Schneider (1867–1958) Basel 
Gustav Schrader
Wilhelm Schlüter
Southwick & Jencks’ Natural History Store Providence, Rhode Island
Otto Staudinger
Stazione Zoologica Anton Dohrn Marine specimens. 
Wilh. Steeg "Dr. Steeg & Reuter" after 1879. Crystallographic microscope slides.
Alexandre Stuer(fl. 1890s-1920?) Paris mineral dealer. Owner of Comptoir Géologique et Minéralogique, 40, rue de Mathurins and at 4, rue de Castellane. 
John Crace Stevens Covent Gardens auctioneer.
Emanuel Sweerts (1552–1612) Dutch merchant and natural history dealer.

Rudolf Tancré (1842–1934) Anklam, Pomerania Dealer in Lepidoptera mainly of Central Asia and Siberia.
Georg Thorey - Hamburg pharmacist and beetle collector. Also sold beetles to other natural history collectors. 
Johann Gustav Friedrich Umlauff (1833–1889) Proprietor of prominent Hamburg-based natural history and ethnographic dealership and associated museum. 
Unio Itineraria a German Scientific Society based in Esslingen am Neckar sold specimens as a dealership.
Van Ingen & Van Ingen
Jules Verreaux Owner of Maison Verreaux, established in 1803 by his father, Jacques Philippe Verreaux, at Place des Vosges in Paris, which was the earliest known company that dealt with objects of natural history.
Jean Villet Cape Town
Voigt & Hochgesang Göttingen
Józef Warszewicz Guatemala 1844-1850
Henry Augustus Ward Founder of Ward's Natural History Establishment in Rochester, New York.
Rowland Ward London
White Watson
William Watkins Began trading in 1874 in Eastbourne. In 1879 the address was 36 The Strand, London. In 1907 the dealership became Watkins & Doncaster (1907). In 1937 ownership passed to Frederick Metté an expert on bird eggs. 
Frank Blake Webster's Naturalists Supply Depot 409 Washington Street, Hyde Park, Massachusetts
Walter Freeman Webb (1869–1957) Shell dealer St. Petersburg, Florida 
Henry Whitely
Bryce McMurdo Wright father (1814-1875) or son (1850-1895), both with same name and both dealers at 90 Great Russell Street, London. They dealt in minerals and fossils, ethnographic and archaeological objects.
Bohuslav Železný  Prague 1890-? Lepidoptera.
Emil Weiske Saalfeld Insect and bird collector and dealer.
Rudolf Zimmermann (1878–1943) mineralogist and dealer in natural history specimens for schools based in Chemnitz, Saxony. Author of Die Mineralien. Eine Anleitung zum Sammeln und Bestimmen derselben nebst einer Beschreibung der wichtigsten Arten

See also
Insektenbörse
Taxidermists

References 

Mark V. Barrow, 2000 The Specimen Dealer: Entrepreneurial Natural History in America’s Gilded Age Journal of the History of Biology 33: 493–534  
Günther, Albert C. L. G. (Albert Carl Ludwig Gotthilf) 1904-1912 The history of the collections contained in the natural history departments of the British Museum. British Museum London, Printed by order of the Trustees
Horn et al., 1990: Collectiones entomologicae. Berlin. 
Mearns B. & Mearns R., 1998: The Bird Collectors. Academic Press, London

External links 

Archive of taxidermists

Natural history dealers